Danger on Deception Island is the ninth installment in the Nancy Drew point-and-click adventure game series by Her Interactive. The game is available for play on Microsoft Windows platforms. It has an ESRB rating of E for moments of mild violence and peril. Players take on the first-person view of fictional amateur sleuth Nancy Drew and must solve the mystery through interrogation of suspects, solving puzzles, and discovering clues. There are two levels of gameplay, Junior and Senior detective modes, each offering a different difficulty level of puzzles and hints, however neither of these changes affect the actual plot of the game. The game is loosely based on a book entitled Whispers in the Fog (1999).

Plot
When Katie Firestone, a friend of George Fayne, invites Nancy Drew to Deception Island in Washington state for a whale-watching excursion, the sleuth arrives to find Katie's tour boat heavily vandalized. A threatening note that was left behind warns Katie to "stop meddling". Apparently, the residents of the harbor are divided over what to do with an orphaned female Orca whale that recently appeared in the channel, and Katie has ruffled a lot of feathers in the debate. Nancy must hunt down the vandal while unraveling some of Deception Island's hidden secrets.

Development

Characters

Nancy Drew - Nancy is an 18-year-old amateur detective from the fictional town of River Heights in the United States. She is the only playable character in the game, which means the player must solve the mystery from her perspective.
Katie Firestone - A friend of George Fayne who invited Nancy to stay with her on Deception Island. Katie is a marine biologist who owns a whale watching tour and takes tourists up close to the orca with her permit.  Her studies theorize that the female whale is sick, and she thinks it should go to an aquarium for further research. Did her unpopular opinions land her in hot water?
Holt Scotto - Holt is an influential community member and veteran fisherman who does not take nonsense from anybody. He is running for public office as harbormaster. He would like nothing more than to get rid of the female orca that is eating the fish in his waters and causing the fishing ships to detour around the harbor. Could he be the one sabotaging the Snake Horse Harbor to intimidate the orca supporters?
Andy Jason - Andy is the owner of Whale World, which rivals Katie's whale-watching tour. He is well-mannered, but an aggressive businessman. He has offered to hire Katie and buy her boat so he can own a larger tour chain on the coast, but she has refused several times.
Jenna Deblin - Jenna is the owner of a local coffee shop. She is usually very friendly, but when it comes to Katie and her research she gets pretty nasty due to their conflicting viewpoints about the orphaned whale. Jenna believes that the orca should be rejoined with its pod immediately and by any means possible. Would that include damaging boats and leaving threats?

Cast
Nancy Drew - Lani Minella
Bess Marvin - Alisa Murray
George Fayne - Jena Cane
Frank Hardy - Wayne Rawley
Joe Hardy - Rob Jones
Katie Firestone - Shelley McIntyre
Jenna Deblin - Amy Augustine
Andy Jason / Casey Porterfield - Jonah von Spreekin
Holt Scotto - Richard Stein
Wood Expert - Julie Rawley
Hilda Swenson - Shannon Kipp

Reception
According to PC Data, Danger on Deception Island sold 40,601 retail copies in North America during 2003. According to review aggregation website Metacritic, the game received "generally favorable reviews" from critics.

Charles Herold of The New York Times found Danger on Deception Island to be inferior to The Haunted Carousel.

References

2003 video games
Detective video games
Video games based on Nancy Drew
Point-and-click adventure games
Video games developed in the United States
Video games scored by Kevin Manthei
Video games set in the United States
Video games set in Washington (state)
Windows games
Windows-only games
Her Interactive games
Single-player video games
North America-exclusive video games